Havelock Airport  is adjacent to the community of Havelock, New Brunswick, Canada.

References

Registered aerodromes in New Brunswick
Transport in Kings County, New Brunswick
Buildings and structures in Kings County, New Brunswick